Boteå Court District, or Boteå tingslag, was a district of Ångermanland in Sweden. The provinces in Norrland were never divided into hundreds and instead the court district (tingslag) served as the basic division of rural areas.

Subdivisions of Sweden
Västernorrland County